The 1993–94 Scottish Challenge Cup was the fourth season of the competition, which was also known as the B&Q Cup for sponsorship reasons. It was competed for by the 26 clubs in the Scottish Football League Division One and Two. The defending champions were Hamilton Academical, who defeated Morton 3–2 in the 1992 final.

The final was played on 12 December 1993, between Falkirk and St Mirren at Fir Park in Motherwell. Falkirk won 3–0, to win the tournament for the first time.

Schedule

First round 
Airdrieonians, Dunfermline Athletic, Hamilton Academical, Morton, Queen's Park and Stirling Albion entered the second round.

Source: SFL

Second round 

Source: SFL

Quarter-finals

Semi-finals

Final

References

External links 
 Scottish Football League Scottish Challenge Cup on Scottish Football League website
 Soccerbase Scottish League Challenge Cup on Soccerbase.com
 ESPN Soccernet  Scottish League Challenge Cup homepage on ESPN Soccernet
 BBC Sport – Scottish Cups Challenge Cup on BBC Sport

Scottish Challenge Cup seasons
Challenge Cup
Scottish Challenge Cup